Visappinte Vili is a 1952 Indian Malayalam-language drama film directed by Mohan Rao and produced by Kunchacko and K. V. Koshi under the banner of K&K Combines. It stars Prem Nazir, Thikkurissy Sukumaran Nair, Kumari Thankam, Pankajavalli, Nanukuttan, Mathappan, S. P. Pillai and Baby Girija.

It was the second film in the career of Prem Nazir. His first appearance with the name Prem Nazir was in this film. It was on the sets of this film that he was renamed Prem Nazir by Thikkurussi Sukumaran Nair. He was credited as Abdul Khader in his debut film Marumakal. Visappinte Vili became the break in his career. Made on a low budget, the film became the highest-grossing film of the year. There were ten other releases in 1952, out of which only Amma enjoyed success.

The film ran for 50-days in 7 release centers.

The film was remade by  K. J. Mohan Rao in Tamil as Pasiyin Kodumai and released on 28 November 1952. Paa. Adhimoolam wrote the dialogues.

Soundtrack

Malayalam
Lyrics were penned by Abhayadev. Playback singers are A. M. Rajah, T. A. Mothi, Jose Prakash, P. Leela, Jikki & Kaviyoor Revamma.

Tamil
Lyrics were penned by Kambadasan, Annal Thango and Paa. Adhimoolam. Playback singers are A. M. Rajah, Madhavapeddi Satyam, P. Leela and Kaviyoor Revamma.

Critical reception 
Cynic of Mathrubhumi wrote, "Prem Nazir's perfect facial expression and uncluttered speech style is a special merit. The face of this young man has not lost its charm, and if he matures and gains more manhood, Prem Nazir may become one of the most important actors in Malayalam cinema."

References

External links
 http://www.malayalachalachithram.com/movie.php?i=28
 
 Visappinte Vili at the Malayalam Movie Database

1950s Malayalam-language films
Malayalam films remade in other languages